Quorn and Woodhouse railway station is a heritage station on the Great Central Railway (preserved) serving Quorn & Woodhouse in Leicestershire. Travelling south from Loughborough, it is the first station that is reached. Here there is a large station yard which is suitable for parking. There is also disabled access through the yard (Loughborough now has a lift for disabled as well as access via stairs). Quorn is laid out to appear as it would in the 1940s, as a typical rural LNER station. The signal box is not original but was taken from Market Rasen.

The station is grade II listed and has a number of attractions, including the 1940s era NAAFI Tea Room situated underneath the station road bridge, a period Station Master's office, as well as wartime films showing in one of the waiting rooms. In 2011, a new café called Butler-Henderson Tea Rooms was opened; the building, whilst not in keeping with the station itself, complements its surroundings and provides another reason to stop off at the station.

A turntable (60-foot balance model) was delivered to the station in January 2010 from Preston Docks. It had previously seen use in the ex-York Roundhouse in the days of steam. The turntable was built in 1909 by Cowans Sheldon Ltd of Carlisle. Work began on digging the foundations in June 2011 with work being completed during the late summer of that year in time for the annual Steam Railway Magazine gala in early October 2011.

In film & television
The station and Great Central Railway line were featured in the fourth episode of the 17th series of BBC's Top Gear programme, shown on 17 July 2011 during a train/car feature, which was filmed in June 2011.

Route

References

Former Great Central Railway stations
Heritage railway stations in Leicestershire
Grade II listed buildings in Leicestershire
Grade II listed railway stations
Great Central Railway (preserved)
Railway stations in Great Britain opened in 1899
Railway stations in Great Britain closed in 1963